The 1957 SFR Yugoslavia Chess Championship was the 12th edition of SFR Yugoslav Chess Championship. Held in Sombor, SFR Yugoslavia, SR Serbia, SAP Vojvodina. The tournament was won by Svetozar Gligorić.

References 

Yugoslav Chess Championships
1957 in chess
Chess